Ankara Aviation Museum is a military-based museum for aviation, owned and operated by the Turkish Air Force. The museum is located in Etimesgut district of Ankara, Turkey.

Location and access

The museum is open to the public everyday but Mondays from 9:00 to 16:30 local time.

History
The museum was established by the Turkish Air Force (TUAF) as the second of its kind in the country. It was opened on 18 September 1998 in presence of Sabiha Gökçen, Atatürk's adopted daughter and the first Turkish female combat pilot.

Museum
The museum covers an area of  including  covered area. In the open space, there are airplanes and a helicopter on display. Among them are three military aircraft of MIG series, particularly  
a PZL-Mielec Lim-6, the Polish variant of MiG-17, donated by the Bulgarian Air Force, a Shenyang J-6, the Chinese built version of the MiG-19, from the Pakistan Air Force and a MIG-21MF gifted by the Hungarian Air Force. Another exhibit is a replica of a Blériot aircraft named Fethi Bey, which was specially manufactured in 2001 for the documentary movie Altın Kanatlar ("Golden Wings") aired by the Turkish Radio and Television Corporation (TRT).

In the covered area, mockups related to the flying tests carried out by the 17th-century Ottoman figures Lagari Hasan Çelebi and Hezarfen Ahmet Çelebi are on display. Other exhibits are mockups of diverse aircraft used by the TUAF since its establishment in 1911. In the hall of "History of Aviation in Turkey and World", there are various photos and documents, half-size mockups of the first Turkish manufactured aircraft Uğur and Pezetel,  TUAF ensigns, mockups of various air force weapon systems, busts of TUAF commanders, aviator uniforms from the beginnings in the Ottoman Empire, banners, insignia as well as name lists of aviation casualties and memorial belongings of commanders. Objects belonging to Cengiz Topel, a TUAF fighter pilot shot down during the Battle of Tylliria, are on display. A corner is dedicated to Sabiha Gökçen, which contains her private belongings related to her aviation career. Another corner is reserved for Turkish female aviators.

In a building provided in 1999 by the TUAF Logistics Command and named Mavi Dünya ("The Blue World"), cockpits of Lockheed T-33 and Northrop F-5 aircraft are placed, which visitors can take a seat in.

See also
 Istanbul Aviation Museum

References

External links
Museum on-line booklet 

Museums in Ankara
Turkish Air Force
1998 establishments in Turkey
Museums established in 1998
Aerospace museums in Turkey
Military and war museums in Turkey
National museums in Turkey
Transport museums in Turkey